Penetretus is a genus of ground beetles in the family Carabidae. There are about five described species in Penetretus.

Species
These five species belong to the genus Penetretus:
 Penetretus andalusicus (Reitter, 1897)  (Spain)
 Penetretus imitator Zamotajlov, 1990  (Spain)
 Penetretus nebrioides (Vuillefroy, 1866)  (Spain)
 Penetretus rufipennis (Dejean, 1828)  (France, Portugal, and Spain)
 Penetretus temporalis Bedel, 1909  (Morocco and Spain)

References

Carabidae